Khori Mahuwa subdivision (also spelled Khuri Mahua)  is an administrative subdivision of the Giridih district in the state of Jharkhand, India.

Subdivision office is located at Domaidih village, which is 10 km from Dhanwar town and 3 km from khorimahua chowk on State Highway 13 (Giridih-koderma road).

History
Khori Mahuwa subdivision was created in March 2014.

Subdivisions
Giridih district is divided into the following administrative subdivisions:

Police stations
Police stations in Khori Mahuwa subdivision have the following features and jurisdiction:

Blocks
Community development blocks in Khori Mahuwa subdivision are:

Education
Given in the table below (data in numbers) is a comprehensive picture of the education scenario in Giridih district:

Educational institutions
The following institutions are located in Khori Mahuwa subdivision:
Adarsh College was established at Rajdhanwar in 1973. It is third college in giridih which is pursuing master of arts degree.
Sanskrit Hindi Vidyapith was established at Jharkhand Dham, Giridih, in 1967. It is an institute specializing in Sanskrit, but also offers other courses. It is affiliated to Vinoba Bhave University. It has hostel facilities.
Langtababa Mahavidyalaya was established at Mirzaganj, Giridih, in 1983. It is affiliated to Vinoba Bhave University. (It is not clear what courses it offers).

References

Sub-divisions in Giridih district